Enniskillenus (named after the Northern Irish village of Enniskillen) is a genus of prehistoric fish from the Eocene. It was described by Casier in 1966.

References
 Enniskillenus, Paleobiology Database

Acanthomorpha
Eocene fish
Eocene fish of Europe